Ivan Bulajić (Serbian Cyrillic: Иван Булајић; born 29 March 1995) is a Serbian football goalkeeper.

Club career
On 27 June 2018, Bulajić signed with Radnički Niš. Bulajić made his official debut for Radnički Niš in 3 fixture match of the 2018–19 Serbian SuperLiga season against Dinamo Vranje, played on 5 August 2018, replacing Mladen Živković in the 34th minute after injury.

Honours
Radnički Pirot
Serbian League (1): 2015–16

References

External links
 
  at srbijafudbal.com 

Living people
1995 births
Footballers from Belgrade
Serbian footballers
Association football goalkeepers
Serbian First League players
Serbian SuperLiga players
FK Radnički Pirot players
FK Radnički Niš players